This following lists the tallest buildings in China by city, including the Special Administrative Regions of Hong Kong and Macau, and excluding Taiwan. A total of 32 cities featured in this list currently have at least one supertall skyscraper taller than 300 meters. The current tallest building in China is the Shanghai Tower in Shanghai, which rises 632 metres (2,073 ft) and was completed in 2015.

Current
This list includes the tallest (completed or topped out) buildings in China by city. All measurements are as defined and recognised by the Council on Tall Buildings and Urban Habitat (CTBUH). Heights are measured to Architectural Top, with antennae being excluded. Only buildings over 300m are included.

Future
This list includes the tallest under construction or proposed buildings in China by city. Only buildings which will become their city's tallest building upon completion are included. Buildings are becoming their city sight. All measurements are as defined and recognised by the Council on Tall Buildings and Urban Habitat (CTBUH). Heights are measured to Architectural Top, with antennae being excluded. Only buildings over 300m are included.

Statistics
This section includes the total number of supertall skyscrapers in China by city in graph format. The section is split to separate complete, under construction (or topped out), and proposed supertall skyscrapers by city. Only cities with more than one skyscraper in a given section are included.

Completed

Under construction

Proposed

See also 
List of tallest buildings in China
List of tallest buildings in Asia
List of tallest buildings in the World

Notes
B.  Topped out, expected completion in 2014.
C.  Topped out, expected completion in 2015.
D.  Topped out, expected completion in 2014.
E.  Topped out, expected completion in 2014.
F.  Topped out, expected completion in 2015.

References

Skyscrapers in China